Barchovice is a municipality and village in Kolín District in the Central Bohemian Region of the Czech Republic. It has about 300 inhabitants.

Administrative parts
Villages of Hryzely and Radlice are administrative parts of Barchovice.

Geography
The municipal territory lies in three geomorphological regions: the eastern part lies in the Upper Sázava Hills, the central part lies in a tip of the Central Elbe Table, and the western part extends into the Benešov Uplands. The eastern municipal border is formed by the Výrovka River.

History
The first written mention of Barchovice is from 1340. The area was divided into two parts, which belonged to different estates (Zásmuky and Kostelec estates) with different owners. The larger part of Barchovice belonged to the Zásmuky estate and its most notable owners were the Sternberg family, who held it from 1653 to 1848.

Sights
Barchovice is poor in monuments. There are three pillared stone belfries, one in each village.

References

External links

Villages in Kolín District